Youssef El-Arabi (born 3 February 1987) is a professional footballer who plays as a striker for Greek Super League club Olympiacos and the Morocco national team.

He began his career with hometown club Caen in Ligue 1, making his debut in 2008. After a season in Saudi Arabia with Al Hilal he signed for La Liga club Granada for a club record €5 million in 2012. He scored 45 goals in 134 official games before leaving for Al-Duhail in 2016. In three years in the Qatar Stars League, he was top scorer twice, and totalled 102 goals in 89 games across all competitions before returning to Europe with Olympiacos.

Born in France, El-Arabi chose to represent Morocco at international level, making his debut in 2010. He represented them at three Africa Cup of Nations tournaments.

Club career

Caen/Al-Hilal
On 20 December 2008, El-Arabi made his debut for Caen, coming on as a substitute in the 76th minute against Lyon in Ligue 1. He played 2 more games that season (coming on in both as a substitute), and scored no goals (2008–09). The following season (2009–10) saw El-Arabi score 11 goals in 34 games (he came on in 11 of these games as a substitute) for Caen, as well as claiming eight assists, in Ligue 2. This season (2010–11) has seen El-Arabi score 17 goals in 38 games for Caen, as well as claiming five assists, in Ligue 1. After rejecting bids from Sevilla FC and Genoa C.F.C, he eventually signed for Al-Hilal FC in July 2011 on a four-year contract.

Granada
On 19 July 2012, El-Arabi returned to Europe, signing a five-year contract for La Liga club Granada for a club record €5 million fee. He made his debut on 20 August, starting as the season began with a 1–0 loss at Rayo Vallecano. His first goal was scored on 7 October, a penalty to open a 2–1 win at Mallorca, and his total of eight goals in 31 games helped his side avoid relegation.

He scored 12 times in his second season at the Estadio Nuevo Los Carmenes, including his first La Liga hat-trick, all three goals in a 3–1 win over rivals Málaga on 8 November 2013. At the end of the season, he was nominated for the Best African player at the LFP Awards, losing out to teammate Yacine Brahimi.

On 4 October 2014, El-Arabi scored in the first minute against Málaga, albeit in a 2–1 away loss. He put the side ahead with a penalty at Levante the following 23 February but was later sent off for scrapping with Iván Ramis in a loss by the same score. Granada avoided relegation on goal difference.

In his final season at Granada, El-Arabi scored 17 times in 38 games, including a hat-trick in a 5–1 win over Levante on 21 April 2016.

Al-Duhail
On 18 July 2016, El-Arabi signed for Lekhwiya SC of the Qatar Stars League. He made his debut on 17 September, scoring the opening goal of a 4–0 home win over Muaither. His 24 goals in 18 games made him joint top scorer for the season alongside Al Sadd's Baghdad Bounedjah, while Lekhwiya won the title.

On 11 December 2017, El-Arabi scored six goals in one match for the renamed Al-Duhail in an 8–0 QSL Cup group stage win at Al-Khor. His team retained their league title, and he was again top scorer, with 26 goals in 20 games, one more than his teammate Youssef Msakni.

Olympiacos
On 6 July 2019, El-Arabi signed a three-year contract with Greek side Olympiacos, returning to Europe after three years in Qatar. He made his Super League Greece debut on 24 August, scoring the only goal of a home win over Asteras Tripoli through a 7th-minute penalty. Three days later, he scored both goals of a 2–1 win at FC Krasnodar in a Champions League play-off second leg match, putting the Piraeus-based team through 6–1 on aggregate. 

El-Arabi scored his first Champions League goal on 22 October 2019 in a 2–3 loss against Bayern Munich. On 11 December 2019, El Arabi scored the only goal with a late penalty against Red Star Belgrade in their final Champions League Group B game, to book a place in the Europa League at the expense of the Serbians. The following 12 January 2020, he scored a hat-trick in a 4–0 away win over Lamia.

On 27 February 2020, Olympiacos played their second leg of the Round of 32 at the Emirates Stadium, and El-Arabi scored a goal at the 119th minute of extra time to knock Arsenal out of the UEFA Europa League on away goals. He scored on 28 June as they won 2–1 at AEK to secure a 45th league title, the first in three years.

In 2020–21, El-Arabi was top scorer with 22 goals as Olympiacos retained the title.
On 4 November 2021, in a 2–1 Europa League loss UEFA Europa League to Eintracht Frankfurt, he surpassed Predrag Đorđević and Kostas Mitroglou as the club's top European scorer with 16 goals, doing so in 33 games.
On 15 December, he scored a hat trick in a 3–0  home win against Atromitos F.C. to reach 50 goals in 81 league appearances; his fourth hat-trick put him equal with Giovanni, having done so in fewer games than the Brazilian's 111.

International career
On 5 September 2010, El-Arabi made his debut for the Morocco national football team, coming on as a substitute in the 65th minute for Mounir El-Hamdaoui against the Central African Republic. He followed this up with games against Tanzania and Northern Ireland, coming on as a substitute in both games.

Manager Eric Gerets named El-Arabi among the 23 players for the 2012 Africa Cup of Nations, where he started and played as a substitute for one game each of a group-stage exit. On 13 October that year, he scored and provided an assist in a 4–0 home win over Mozambique as the Atlas Lions overturned a first-leg deficit to reach the 2013 edition; in another group exit in South Africa, he scored the equaliser in a draw with Cape Verde.

On 29 March 2016, El-Arabi scored both goals in a 2–0 win over the same opponents at the Stade de Marrakech to qualify for the 2017 Africa Cup of Nations. Hervé Renard called him up for the finals in Gabon, where he made only an 11-minute substitute appearance in a run to the quarter-finals. He was a noted omission from the French manager's squad for the 2018 FIFA World Cup in Russia.

Career statistics

Club

International
Scores and results list Morocco's goal tally first.

Honours
Caen
Ligue 2: 2009–10

Al Hilal
Saudi Crown Prince Cup: 2011–12

Al Duhail
Qatar Stars League: 2016–17, 2017–18
Qatar Emir Cup: 2018, 2019
Qatar Cup: 2018
Qatari Sheikh Jassim Cup: 2016; runner-up: 2018

Olympiacos
Super League Greece: 2019–20, 2020–21, 2021–22
Greek Cup: 2019–20; runner-up: 2020–21
Individual
AFC Champions League OPTA Best XI: 2018
Qatar Stars League Top goalscorer: 2016–17,  2017–18  
Qatar Starts League Player of the Month: October 2017
Super League Greece Player of the Year: 2020–21 
Super League Greece Top goalscorer: 2019–20, 2020–21
Super League Greece Best Foreign Player: 2019–20, 2020–21 
Super League Greece Team of the Year: 2019–20, 2020–21  
Super League Greece Player of the Month: January 2020, December 2020, November 2021,May 2022
Olympiacos Player of the Year: 2019–20, 2020–21, 2021–22 
Records
Top goalscorer in the history of Olympiacos in European Competitions
With 18 European goals and became the top scorer in the history of Morocco in the European Cups!

References

External links

 

1987 births
Living people
Footballers from Caen
Association football forwards
Moroccan footballers
Stade Malherbe Caen players
Al Hilal SFC players
Granada CF footballers
Lekhwiya SC players
Al-Duhail SC players
Olympiacos F.C. players
Moroccan expatriate footballers
Morocco international footballers
Ligue 1 players
Ligue 2 players
La Liga players
Super League Greece players
2012 Africa Cup of Nations players
2013 Africa Cup of Nations players
2017 Africa Cup of Nations players
Expatriate footballers in Saudi Arabia
Expatriate footballers in Spain
Expatriate footballers in Greece
French sportspeople of Moroccan descent
Moroccan expatriate sportspeople in Spain
Moroccan people of Arab descent
Saudi Professional League players
Qatar Stars League players
French expatriate sportspeople in Spain
French expatriate sportspeople in Saudi Arabia
French expatriate sportspeople in Qatar
French expatriate sportspeople in Greece
Moroccan expatriate sportspeople in Saudi Arabia
Moroccan expatriate sportspeople in Qatar
Moroccan expatriate sportspeople in Greece
Sportspeople convicted of crimes